Reginald T. Edwards (born 1912, date of death unknown) was an English professional footballer who played as a centre forward. He started his career with Brierley Hill Alliance and joined Football League Second Division club Burnley in June 1931. Edwards made 18 league appearances for Burnley and scored five goals before moving to Walsall in September 1933.

References

1912 births
Year of death missing
People from Coseley
English footballers
Association football forwards
Brierley Hill Alliance F.C. players
Burnley F.C. players
Walsall F.C. players
English Football League players